Rapture Ruckus is the debut EP by New Zealand Christian hip hop/rock group Rapture Ruckus, released through Tooth & Nail Records on June 8, 2010. It is a US release of the EP, Hold On, which was released in New Zealand on the same day through Parachute Records containing a slightly different track listing.

Track listing

Awards
The album was nominated for a Dove Award for Rap/Hip-Hop Album of the Year at the 42nd GMA Dove Awards.

References

External links
 Official website

Rapture Ruckus albums
2010 debut EPs